Daulatpur union is a union of Fatikchhari Upazila in Chittagong District, Bangladesh.

Geography

Area of Daulatpur: 2,871 acres (11.62 km2).

Location
North: Nanupur Union 
East:  Lelang Union
South: Jafotnagar Union
West:  Suabil Union

Population
At the 1991 Bangladesh census, Daulatpur union had a population of 25,918 and house units 4454.

Marketplaces and bazaars
 Baryarhat
 Nazirhat
 Fakirhat
 ABC mini Market
 Janata club front market

Villages and mouzas
 Abdul Karim Munshir Bari
 Foreman'r Bari
 Dayem chowdhury Bari
 Mistri'r Bari
 Chowdhury Bari
 Boxu Mia Sarker Bari
 Haji Alhaj Kabir Ahmed Bari, Dainjuri

Education
 Daulatpur ABC High School
 Daulatpur ABC Primary School
 Gultaz Memorial School & College
 Syed-Syeda Memorial High School
 Nazirhat Adarsho High School
 Nur Ahmed Engineering High School

Madrasas
 Syadia Tyabia Madrasa
 Jamyia Millia Ahmodia kamil Madrasa

Notable people
 Muhibbullah Babunagari, Bangladeshi Deobandi Islamic Scholar and Key person of Hefazat-e-Islam Bangladesh (born 1935)

References
Informations:

Unions of Fatikchhari Upazila